Detroit Radiant Products Company, founded in 1955, is a United States manufacturer of gas fired infrared heating appliances.

Overview
Detroit Radiant Products Company is located in Warren, Michigan. The manufacturing facility occupies over 100,000 square feet.

History 
Detroit Radiant was founded in 1955, in Detroit, Michigan.

Active products (as of 2009) 
The following are active products manufactured by Detroit Radiant Products:
High intensity space heaters
Low intensity tube heaters
Patio heaters
Portable construction heaters
Electric heaters

Industry associations
 Infrared Heater Safety council
 USGBC

References

External links 

 reverberray.com
 processburners.com

Companies based in Macomb County, Michigan
Manufacturing companies established in 1955
1955 establishments in Michigan